Bru is a former municipality in the old Sogn og Fjordane county, Norway. The  municipality existed from 1923 until 1964 and it included several islands including Svanøya, Askrova, and Stavøya as well as parts of the mainland including the Solheimsdalen valley, east of the village of Norddalsfjord. It is now part of the present-day Kinn Municipality which is in Vestland county in the traditional district of Sunnfjord.  The administrative center of Bru was the village of Stavang.

Name
The name of the municipality (and parish) comes from the old name for the island Brulandet (now called Svanøya), where the first church was located.  The church site was moved off the island to the mainland village of Stavang in 1872.  The Old Norse name for the church was Brúa, which is identical with the word for "bridge".

History
The parish of Bru was established as a municipality on 1 January 1923 when the large municipality of Kinn was divided into three: Kinn (population: 2,508) in the west, Bru (population: 1,560) in the centre, and Eikefjord (population: 929) in the east.

During the 1960s, there were many municipal mergers across Norway due to the work of the Schei Committee. On 1 January 1964, Bru municipality ceased to exist and its lands were divided.
 All of Bru located north of the Førdefjorden (population: 1,155) was merged with the town of Florø (population: 2,040), Kinn Municipality (population: 3,567), Eikefjord Municipality (population: 919), the Husefest and Breivik areas of Bremanger Municipality (population: 9), and the Steindal area of Vevring Municipality (population: 25) were combined to form the new municipality of Flora. 
 All of Bru located south of the Førdefjorden (population: 92) was merged with Askvoll Municipality (population: 3,086) and the parts of Vevring Municipality located south of the Førdefjorden (population: 407).

Government

Municipal council
The municipal council  of Bru was made up of 17 representatives that were elected to four year terms.  The party breakdown of the final municipal council was as follows:

See also
List of former municipalities of Norway

References

External links

Kinn
Former municipalities of Norway
1923 establishments in Norway
1964 disestablishments in Norway